Tang Ming Huang is a Chinese television series based on historical events in the reign of Emperor Xuanzong of the Tang dynasty. The series was directed by Chen Jialin and starred Liu Wei as the eponymous emperor. It was first broadcast on CCTV-1 in 1990 in mainland China.

Cast

Imperial clan

 Liu Wei as Li Longji (Emperor Xuanzong of Tang)
 Yin Shen as young Li Longji
 Lin Fangbing as Yang Yuhuan
 Lin Ruping as Gao Lishi
 Li Jianqun as Consort Wu
 Zhu Lin as Wu Zetian
 Yan Minqiu as Princess Taiping
 Tian Chengren as Li Dan (Emperor Ruizong of Tang)
 Li Jingli as Empress Wang
 Zhou Jie as Consort Zhao
 Zhao Ying as Empress Wei
 Sun Qianqian as Princess Anle
 Zhao Ruping as Li Xian (Emperor Zhongzong of Tang)
 Ji Yuan as Li Fan
 Chang Ningguo as Li Chengqi
 Huang Xiaolei as Li Mao
 Wang Shiyuan as young Li Mao
 Dou Lianxi as Li Ying
 Guo Yu as young Li Ying
 Hao Yan as Princess Xianyi
 Yang Mi as young Princess Xianyi
 Zong Ping as Yang Hui
 Huang Guangxue as Li Ju
 Yin Li as Li Yao
 Li Xiaoli as Princess Yuzhen
 Lin Daxin as Li Heng (Emperor Suzong of Tang)
 Li Bo as young Li Heng
 Chen Zhonghe as Empress Zhang
 Zhang Liping as Consort Wei
 Li Xiujiang as Princess Consort of Xinshou
 Chi Feifei as Princess Rongyi
 Xin Lisha as Princess Consort of Qi
 Che Yue as Li Chu (Emperor Daizong of Tang)

Kaiyuan era figures

 Zheng Rong as Yao Chong
 Chen Xiuying as Yao Chong's wife
 Wang Weiguo as Yao Yi (姚彝)
 Mao Xiaoming as Yao Yi (姚异)
 Niu Xingli as Lu Huaishen
 Wang Bing as Song Jing
 Han Zaifeng as Chen Xuanli
 Han Tongsheng as Zong Chuke
 Han Tingqi as Wei Wen
 Wang Zhicheng as Wei Xuan
 Lin Zongying as Shangguan Wan'er
 Ye Qinglin as Dou Huaizhen
 Jiang Yang as Xue Chongjian
 Li Yaohua as Jiang Jiao
 Xu Yazhi as Wu Sumei
 Zhao Runfeng as Zhangsun Xin
 Zhang Yuchun as Ge Fushun
 Che Xiaotong as Cui Shi
 Li Hong as Zhang Yue
 Shui Jingqin as Huifan
 Hao Tienan as Xue Ne
 Zhao Jian as Tang Shao
 Tang Zhijiang as Wang Maozhong
 Ma Qun as Ni Ruobing
 Deng Guangxun as Shang Zanduo
 Wang Yanmin as Wu Daozi
 Huang Lijia as Yi Xing
 Wu Baojie as Zhang Xu
 Chu Jianfu as Chao Heng

Tianbao era figures

 Lou Jicheng as Li Linfu
 Yan Bide as An Lushan
 Gao Lancun as Yang Guozhong
 Li Aili as Pei Rou
 Liao Xueqiu as Yang Yuyao
 Ba Lihong as Yang Yuxiu
 Yu Liwen as Yang Xuanjiao
 Lu Jun as Yang Xian
 Liang Xingjia as Yang Qi
 Guo Weihong as Yang Yuling
 Cheng Wenkuan as Yang Shenjin
 Chen Weiguo as Wei Jian
 Shi Weijian as Li Bai
 Chen Ying as Zhang Jiuling
 Wang Pei as He Zhizhang
 Han Li as Li Shizhi
 Wang Ying as Niu Xianke
 Guo Shaoxiong as Ji Wen
 Li Hucheng as Li Mi
 Chen Congming as Li Guinian
 Zhang Xiaojun as Wang Zhongsi
 Hou Yongsheng as Geshu Han
 Li Ming as Li Fuguo
 Shao Wanlin as Wei Jiansu
 Yu De'an as Wang Sili
 Li Liangtao as Shi Siming
 Peng Jun as Guo Ziyi
 Yang Haiquan as An Qingxu
 Liu Tongwei as Yan Zhuang
 Jiang Chongxia as Gao Shang
 Xu Wenguang as An Qingzong
 Chen Weiya as Sun Xiaozhe

Others

 Li Yingqiu as Wang Ling
 Shi Min as Gongsun Ling'er
 Hu Zehong as Talented Lady Zhou
 Xiao Xiaohua as Niu Gui'er
 Jia Zhanhong as Niu Xiu'er
 Su Ke as Xiaoya'er
 Wang Hongtao as old monk
 Xu Xiulin as old palace maid
 Zhang Jinghai as Li Yide
 Song Baosen as Purun
 Wu Bike as Inspector Zhang
 Dong Zhizhi as Yuan Qiu'er
 Di Fengrong as Witch Ma
 Zhang Bei as Hua'er
 Lu Chi as Yang Huan
 Wang Guangquan as wild man from Luzhou
 Li Yi as Lady Hu
 Du Zhigang as Wei Zhi
 Yang Pingyou as Li Xiu
 Liu Yunming as craftsman
 Li Guojing as He Ying
 Zhao Kai as Li Qi
 Ju Xinhua as Du Qianyun

External links
  Tang Ming Huang on Sina.com

1990 Chinese television series debuts
Television series set in the Tang dynasty
Mandarin-language television shows
Chinese historical television series
China Central Television original programming
Emperor Xuanzong of Tang